Hannah Clowes (born 24 February 1991) is an English artistic gymnast who has represented England at the 2006 Commonwealth Games and Great Britain at the 2007 World Artistic Gymnastics Championships. She did not make the Beijing Olympic Team.  Clowes also more recently attended Liverpool Johns Moores University, where she studied Sports science related to gymnastics.

References

External links
 

1991 births
Living people
British female artistic gymnasts
English female artistic gymnasts
Commonwealth Games silver medallists for England
Commonwealth Games medallists in gymnastics
Gymnasts at the 2006 Commonwealth Games
Medallists at the 2006 Commonwealth Games